"Chariots of Fire" is an instrumental theme written and recorded by Vangelis for the soundtrack of the 1981 film of the same name. It has been covered by numerous performers and used for various television programs and sporting events.

Overview
On the film's soundtrack album, the piece is called "Titles" because of its use in the movie's opening titles sequence, but it widely became known as "Chariots of Fire".

When the single debuted at #94 on the Billboard Hot 100 during the week ending 12 December 1981, it was known as "Titles." Seven weeks later, when it moved to #68 on the Hot 100 chart dated 30 January 1982, the single was now listed as "Chariots of Fire" and stayed with that name for the remainder of its chart run. The new title made it easier for both listeners and radio DJs to identify the piece.

According to AllMusic, the track title was listed as "Chariots of Fire - Titles" on the U.S. Billboard Hot 100 chart, and simply as "Chariots of Fire" on the Adult Contemporary chart. A 1989 CD single release also gave the title of the piece as "Chariots of Fire".

Allegations of plagiarism
Vangelis was accused of plagiarising "Chariots of Fire" from a piece by fellow Greek composer Stavros Logaridis called "City of Violets". Vangelis won in court by (a) persuading the judge that he had had no opportunity to hear Logaridis's piece before he composed "Chariots of Fire"; and (b) demonstrating to the judge's satisfaction that the key musical sequence described as "the turn" (which consisted of the four notes F-G-A-G), the only sequence where the judge noted a clear similarity between the two compositions, was already common in music, and had previously been used by Vangelis in a piece "Wake Up" by Aphrodite's Child that predated "City of Violets."

Chart history
"Chariots of Fire" stayed for one week at number one on the Billboard Hot 100 in May 1982, after climbing steadily for five months (it made #1 in its 22nd week on the chart), and to date remains the only piece by a Greek artist to top the U.S. charts.

The single spent 64 weeks on the Australian charts, although it only peaked at #21. In Japan, "Chariots of Fire" was the best-selling single of 1981. The track proved moderately successful in the UK, where it reached #12, but its parent album peaked at #5 and spent 107 weeks on the album chart.

The single reached #3 (2012), #18 (2014), #16 (2015) position on the Billboard Classical Digital Songs chart.

Weekly charts

Year-end charts

Music video
The music video for "Chariots of Fire" shows Vangelis playing a piano and percussion instruments in a concert hall, Vangelis playing a synthesizer in a recording studio, and scenes from the film.

Cover versions
Many cover versions of "Chariots of Fire" have been recorded in all styles by all manners of artists, including the orchestral sounds of John Williams and the  Boston Pops, the electric guitars of The Shadows, the soft piano of Richard Clayderman, the pan flute of Zamfir, and the jazz of The Bad Plus.

Vocal recordings of "Chariots of Fire" have been made by Melissa Manchester, Jane Olivor, Mireille Mathieu, Demis Roussos, and others — all with lyrics, "Race to the End" provided by Jon Anderson.

Appearances in other media
In light of its original use, the piece is often used for comedic effect in numerous slow-motion sequences and/or parodies of the sports genre in various films, television episodes, and commercials.

It was played when Apple Inc.'s chairman Steve Jobs introduced the first Macintosh on 24 January 1984 at a technology demonstration event, and at another press conference celebrating 100-day anniversary of the release of the first Macintosh.

Olympics
Owing both to its sweeping tune and the content of the movie in which it first appeared, "Chariots of Fire" has become somewhat synonymous with the Olympic Games. The BBC used the piece as its theme music for its coverage of the 1984 Summer Olympics held in Los Angeles and also the 1988 Summer Olympics held in Seoul. It was also used as a theme for the 1984 Winter Olympics in Sarajevo, and it was played prior to the start of the men's 100m race final at the 1996 Summer Olympics in Atlanta.

It became prominent leading up to, and during the 2012 Summer Olympics in London. Runners in a test event at Olympic Park, whose route ended at the grand opening of London's Olympic Stadium, were greeted by the piece as they finished their route into the new stadium. The piece was also used to fanfare the carriers of the Olympic flame on parts of its route through the UK. The piece, and other remixes of it, was also used during each medal ceremony of the Games.

The piece was also performed by the London Symphony Orchestra during the opening ceremony of the games, as part of a skit starring comedian Rowan Atkinson reprising his role as Mr. Bean, seen playing a repeated note on a synthesizer whilst using a cellphone, and later an umbrella to play the note while trying to grab a tissue to blow his nose, and then falling into a daydream parodying the opening "beach run" scene from the "Chariots of Fire" film itself.

Other
Jack Black references the song while in a record shop in the movie The Holiday (2006).

It was played in the 2003 film Bruce Almighty and the 2005 film Madagascar.

In a 2012 documentary Falklands' Most Daring Raid, Aircraft Electronics Officer Hugh Prior stated that upon the successful completion of Operation Black Buck 1, he "played it at full blast" in the cockpit of his Avro Vulcan.

The song appears in the soundtrack of Gran Turismo 7, playing just before entering the World GT Series championship races.

See also
List of Hot 100 number-one singles of 1982 (U.S.)
List of number-one adult contemporary singles of 1982 (U.S.)

References

External links
 [ Song Review] from AllMusic

Film theme songs
Vangelis songs
1981 singles
1982 singles
1980s instrumentals
Billboard Hot 100 number-one singles
Cashbox number-one singles
Songs written for films
Pop instrumentals
Songs with music by Vangelis
1981 songs
Polydor Records singles
Songs involved in plagiarism controversies